Takht-e Ravan may refer to:
 Takht-e Ravan-e Olya
 Takht-e Ravan-e Sofla